The 2018 Horizon League women's basketball tournament (also known as Motor City Madness) was the conference tournament that ended the 2017–18 season of the Horizon League. It was being played from March 2 through March 6, 2018, at Little Caesars Arena in Detroit. Regular-season champion Green Bay won the tournament and earned the Horizon League's automatic berth into the 2018 NCAA women's tournament.

Seeds
All 10 teams are participating in the tournament. The top six teams received a bye into the Second round. This was a change from the previous season where the top two seeds received double byes into the Semifinals.
Teams were seeded by record within the conference, with a tiebreaker system to seed teams with identical conference records.

Schedule

Bracket

References

2017–18 Horizon League women's basketball season
Horizon League women's basketball tournament
Horizon League women's basketball tournament
Basketball competitions in Detroit
2018 in Detroit
Women's sports in Michigan
College basketball tournaments in Michigan